Czerniejów may refer to the following places:
Czerniejów, Chełm County in Lublin Voivodeship (east Poland)
Czerniejów, Lubartów County in Lublin Voivodeship (east Poland)
Czerniejów, Gmina Jabłonna in Lublin Voivodeship (east Poland)